St. Martin's Parish Church in Bled (northwestern Slovenia) is the parish church of the Parish of Bled.

Construction
A Gothic Revival structure was built from 1903 until 1905 according to plans by the Austrian architect Friedrich von Schmidt, with minor modifications, particularly in regard to internal equipment, by the architect Josip Vancaš. It was built by the Gustav Tönnies Company from Ljubljana.

Equipment
The church contains a number of frescoes painted in 1930 by the Prešeren Award-winning artist Slavko Pengov, including one portraying Vladimir Lenin as Judas Iscariot in a depiction of the Last Supper. It also hosts a number of statues by Ivan Vurnik.

References

External links

Roman Catholic churches completed in 1905
Bled
Gothic Revival church buildings in Slovenia
Saint Martin
1905 establishments in Austria-Hungary
20th-century Roman Catholic church buildings in Slovenia